The men's Swedish Open (sponsored by Skistar) is an ATP Tour 250 tennis tournament on the ATP Tour held in Båstad, Sweden in July.

The women's Swedish Open (sponsored by Collector) is a tennis tournament held in Båstad, Sweden, between 2009 and 2017 as an International tournament and successor to the Nordic Light Open in Stockholm, and from 2019 onwards a challenger-level tournament. It is played on outdoor clay courts.

History
The Swedish Open was first held in 1948 when it was called the International Swedish Hard Court Championships.  Between 1970 and 1989 the men's event was part of the Grand Prix tennis circuit.

The first three tournaments were won by Eric Sturgess from South Africa. Other famous champions include Ilie Năstase (1971), Björn Borg (1974, 1978–1979), Mats Wilander (1982–1983, 1985), and Rafael Nadal (2005).
The stadium in which the tournament is held underwent reconstruction in 2002 to accommodate the new hotel underneath the seaside bleachers.

From 1948 to 1990, there was also a women's singles tournament. After the Nordic Light Open in Stockholm was sold, it was announced that the women's event would return to Båstad. Since 2009 the Collector Swedish Open Women in Båstad has been an International-level tournament. In 2018 the women's tournament license was sold and it was held in Moscow (Russia) as Moscow River Cup from 22 to 27 July 2018. However, in 2019, the tournaments was reinstated as WTA 125K series tournament.

Title sponsors

ATP
The tournament has in the latter years been named after its principal sponsor. These sponsors have changed, thus changing the name of the tournament. Title sponsors include:

Investor Swedish Open (19?? – 1999), sponsored by Investor AB
Wideyes Swedish Open (2000), sponsored by Wideyes
Telenordia Swedish Open (2001–2002), sponsored by Telenordia
Synsam Swedish Open (2003–2006), sponsored by Synsam
Catella Swedish Open (2007–2009), sponsored by Catella
SkiStar Swedish Open (2010 – 2019), sponsored by Skistar
 Nordea Open (2019 (cancelled) - present) sponsorer by Nordea

WTA
The tournament was sponsored by Ericsson until the Women's and Men tournament shared title sponsor first with Skistar and then currently Nordea

International Series Tournament of the Year
Each year, the players on the ATP Tour vote for the ATP Tournament of the Year. Swedish Open has received this honor eleven consecutive years, winning the International Series Tournament of the Year in the ATP 250 category from 2002 to 2012. The Swedish Open is the only tournament to have won this award eleven times.

Past finals

Men's singles

Men's doubles

Women's singles

1948–present

Women's doubles

References

External links

 
 Association of Tennis Professionals (ATP) tournament profile
 Women's Tennis Association (WTA) tournament profile

 
Clay court tennis tournaments
Recurring sporting events established in 1948
Sport in Skåne County
July sporting events
1948 establishments in Sweden